Michael Richard Alexander FIET FIGEM FIChemE (born 17 November 1947) is a British engineer and businessman, and a former chief executive of British Energy.

Early life
He attended grammar school in Southport (then in Lancashire, now in Merseyside). From the University of Manchester Institute of Science and Technology he obtained a first-class BSc degree in Chemical Engineering, then an MSc degree in Control Engineering.

Career

BP
He joined BP in 1966.

British Gas
He joined British Gas (BG) in 1991. From 1993 to 1996 he was managing director of Public Gas Supply. The Public Gas Supply division was merged with the Business Gas division. From 1996 to December 2001 he was managing director of British Gas. On 17 February 1997, Centrica was formed, with BG Group (former British Gas exploration). On 1 January 2002 Mark Clare took over as managing director of British Gas Residential Energy.

From became Chief Operating Officer of Centrica on 1 January 2002, leaving at the end of February 2002.

British Energy
On 1 March 2003 he became the chief executive of British Energy. On 22 March 2005 he was removed as chief executive of British Energy, when aged 56. British Energy was the largest producer of electricity in the UK.

ATOC
From 2008 to 2009 he was the Chairman of the Association of Train Operating Companies (ATOC, now the Rail Delivery Group).

Personal life
He divorced in 2011. He has two sons. He lives in Chalfont St Peter.

See also
 Sir Adrian Montague (Chairman from 2002 to 2009 of British Energy)

References

1947 births
Living people
Alumni of the University of Manchester Institute of Science and Technology
British chemical engineers
British chief executives in the energy industry
Businesspeople in nuclear power
Centrica people
Fellows of the Institution of Chemical Engineers
Fellows of the Institution of Engineering and Technology
Nuclear power in the United Kingdom
People from Chalfont St Peter
People from Southport